Basil Erne (born 2 June 2000) is a Swiss professional footballer who plays as a left-back for Swiss club Zürich U21.

Career statistics

Club

Notes

References

2000 births
People from Meilen District
Living people
Swiss men's footballers
Association football defenders
FC Zürich players
Swiss Super League players
Swiss Promotion League players
Sportspeople from the canton of Zürich